The III Royal Bavarian Army Corps / III Bavarian AK was a corps level command of the Royal Bavarian Army, part of the German Army, before and during World War I.

As the German and Bavarian Armies expanded in the latter part of the 19th century, the III Royal Bavarian Army Corps of the Bavarian Army was set up on 1 April 1900 in Nuremberg as the Generalkommando (headquarters) for Middle Franconia, the Upper Palatinate and parts of Upper Franconia, Lower Bavaria and Upper Bavaria.  Like all Bavarian formations, it was assigned to the IV Army Inspectorate which became the 6th Army at the start of the First World War.  The Corps was disbanded at the end of the War.

Peacetime organisation 
The 25 peacetime Corps of the German Army (Guards, I - XXI, I - III Bavarian) had a reasonably standardised organisation.  Each consisted of two divisions with usually two infantry brigades, one field artillery brigade and a cavalry brigade each.  Each brigade normally consisted of two regiments of the appropriate type, so each Corps normally commanded 8 infantry, 4 field artillery and 4 cavalry regiments.  There were exceptions to this rule:
V, VI, VII, IX and XIV Corps each had a 5th infantry brigade (so 10 infantry regiments)
II, XIII, XVIII and XXI Corps had a 9th infantry regiment
I, VI and XVI Corps had a 3rd cavalry brigade (so 6 cavalry regiments)
the Guards Corps had 11 infantry regiments (in 5 brigades) and 8 cavalry regiments (in 4 brigades).
Each Corps also directly controlled a number of other units.  This could include one or more
Foot Artillery Regiment
Jäger Battalion
Pioneer Battalion
Train Battalion

World War I

Organisation on mobilisation 
On mobilization on 2 August 1914 the Corps was restructured.  5th Cavalry Brigade was withdrawn to form part of the Bavarian Cavalry Division and the 6th Cavalry Brigade was broken up and its regiments assigned to the divisions as reconnaissance units.  Divisions received engineer companies and other support units from the Corps headquarters. In summary, III Bavarian Corps mobilised with 25 infantry battalions, 8 machine gun companies (48 machine guns), 8 cavalry squadrons, 24 field artillery batteries (144 guns), 4 heavy artillery batteries (16 guns), 3 pioneer companies and an aviation detachment.

Combat chronicle 
On mobilisation, III Royal Bavarian Corps was assigned to the predominantly Bavarian 6th Army forming part of the left wing of the forces for the Schlieffen Plan offensive in August 1914.

Commanders 
The III Royal Bavarian Corps had the following commanders during its existence:

See also 

German Army order of battle (1914)
List of Imperial German infantry regiments
List of Imperial German artillery regiments
List of Imperial German cavalry regiments
Grafenwoehr Training Area

Notes

References

Bibliography 
 
 
 
 
 

Corps of Germany in World War I
Military units and formations of Bavaria
1900 establishments in Bavaria
1919 disestablishments in Germany
Military units and formations established in 1900
Military units and formations disestablished in 1919